Yarella Daniela Torres Cisternas (born 7 January 1992) is a Chilean footballer who plays as a defender for CD Arturo Fernández Vial and the Chile women's national team.

Club career
Torres played the 2010 Copa Libertadores Femenina for Everton de Viña del Mar. She remained in that club until 2012. From 2013 to 2018, she played for Santiago Wanderers. In 2019, she joined CD Palestino.

On 9 September 2020, Torres signed with CD Arturo Fernández Vial.

International career
Torres made her senior debut for Chile on 8 October 2019.

References

External links

1992 births
Living people
Chilean women's footballers
Women's association football defenders
Women's association football midfielders
Everton de Viña del Mar footballers
Santiago Wanderers footballers
Club Deportivo Palestino footballers
Chile women's international footballers